The National Day of the Republic of China or the Taiwan National Day, also referred to as Double Ten Day or Double Tenth Day, is a public holiday on 10 October, now held annually as national day in Taiwan (officially the Republic of China, ROC). It commemorates the start of the Wuchang Uprising on 10 October 1911 which ultimately led to the collapse of the imperial Qing dynasty and establishment of the Republic of China on 1 January 1912. The day was once held as public holiday in mainland China during the Mainland Period of the ROC before 1949. The subsequent People's Republic of China continues to observe the Anniversary of the Xinhai Revolution at the same date but not as a public holiday, which put more emphasis on its revolutionary characteristics as commemoration of a historical event rather than celebration to the founding of the Republic of China.

Following the outcome of the Chinese Civil War, the ROC government lost control of mainland China to the Chinese Communist Party and retreated to the island of Taiwan in December 1949. The National Day is mainly celebrated in all ROC-controlled territories, but it is also celebrated by many overseas Chinese communities.

Celebration in Taiwan

During the establishment of the Republic of China, Taiwan and Penghu were under Japanese rule, which began in 1895. In 1945, after surrender of the Empire of Japan in World War II, Taiwan and Penghu were placed under the control of the ROC.

In Taiwan, the official celebration begins with the raising of the flag of the Republic of China in front of the Presidential Office Building, along with a public singing of the National Anthem of the Republic of China. It is then followed by celebrations in front of the Presidential Office Building; from time to time, a military parade may occur. Festivities also include many aspects of traditional Chinese and/or Taiwanese culture, such as the lion dance and drum teams, and cultural features coming from Taiwanese aborigines are integrated into the display in recent years. Later in the day, the president of the Republic of China would address the country and fireworks displays are held throughout the major cities of the island. In 2009, all government sponsored festivities for the Double Ten Day were cancelled, and the money intended for the festivals (NT$70 million) were reallocated for reconstruction of the damage done by Typhoon Morakot.

In 2022 former President Ma Ying-jeou, who opposes the styling of the holiday as Taiwan National Day, publicly called for current President Tsai Ing-wen to stop using the name Taiwan National Day in material associated with the holiday. His view was criticized by Robert Tsao as obsolete. 

Because of the lack of direct relations between the origin of the holiday and Taiwan in modern Taiwan the holiday is widely believed to be slightly absurd but is still widely celebrated.

National Day Military Parade

In the past, the Republic of China Armed Forces have traditionally put on a military parade. During this parade, troops and equipment are marched past a reviewing platform in front of the Presidential Office Building. Typically, foreign ambassadors, military officers, and other representatives and dignitaries are invited to view the parade. Following the National Anthem and the firing of a 21-gun salute, the parade commander, a general-ranked officer of any of the service branches of the ROCAF, would then be driven to the front of the grandstand to inform the President of the permission to commence the parade proper. (Until 1975, the President also inspected the parade formations riding a vehicle, as each battalion of the parade formations presented arms in his/her presence and all the unit colours and guidons also dipped in his/her presence.)  The presidential holiday address to the ROCAF and the country was the finale of the parade wherein all the units comprising the ground column, following the march past, reassembles at the center of the road for the address.

The parade has been held intermittently during the period of the Republic of China on Taiwan. The military parade on 10 October 1949, was the first public military parade held in Taiwan with Chen Cheng serving as the Grand Review Officer. The 1964 National Day parade was struck by tragedy when a low flying air force F-104 Starfighter fighter aircraft struck a Broadcasting Corporation of China tower, causing the plane's fuel tank to fall and kill three people including a woman and her baby in front of the Central Weather Bureau building in downtown Taipei. The other two remaining F-104 aircraft were ordered to look for the crashed aircraft and accidentally collided and crashed in Tucheng City, Taipei County (now New Taipei City), killing both pilots. The parade was not held again until 1971 (the 60th anniversary), while the mobile column and flypast segments returned in 1975. When Chen Shui-bian became president, the parade was not held until 2007 and then it was entitled a "Celebration Drill" and not a traditional military parade. Since Ma Ying-jeou became president, one parade has been held on the centenary celebrations of the Double Tenth Day, and another on the 105th, the only one under Tsai Ing-wen's presidency.

The tradition of shouting "Long live the Republic of China!" at the end of the addresses by the president of the Republic of China was not held for the first time in 2016. It was also the very year that fire and police services joined the parade for the first time in history, breaking a tradition of a purely-military parade to include personnel from civil uniformed services.

List of Republic of China National Day Parades

Full order of march past for National Day Parades until 1991 
Until 1991, following the opening report by the Parade commander, usually a lieutenant general or vice admiral of the ROCAF, the massed military bands of the ROC Armed Forces, led by the Senior Drum Major, would take their positions in the parade, playing the ROC Armed Forces March, a medley of the official songs of the service branches of the armed forces. Then the parade would march past, in the following sequence, with minor variations over the years:

Ground column 
 ROC Armed Forces Joint Honor Guard
 Parade commander and staff
 Joint Division of Armed Forces Academies
 Republic of China Military Academy 
 Republic of China Naval Academy
 Republic of China Air Force Academy
 National Defense University College of Political Warfare Instruction
 ROC Air Force Institute of Technology
 Chung-cheng Armed Forces Preparatory School
 Army Academy R.O.C.
 Contingent of personnel from the service branches
 ROCA combined divisional formation
 Composite brigade of ROCN personnel (including Republic of China Marine Corps)
 Composite group of ROCAF ground and air defense personnel
 Republic of China Military Police
 Republic of China Joint Logistics Command
 Reserve and militia formations of the Republic of China Armed Forces Reserve
 Female battalion of the College of Political Warfare Instruction
 Drum and Bugle Corps of military educational institutions
 Taiwan Police College (formed part in past parades of the 1970s and 1980s)

Flypast 
The parade's flypast segment was for many years organized in like manner as in the Bastille Day military parade. First, while the honor guard departs from the presidential grandstand the training, fighter and transport aircraft of the ROC Air Force, the transport and anti-submarine aircraft of ROCN Naval Aviation and transport planes of ROCA Army Aviation fly past first, followed by the helicopters of all three service branches, together with those of the National Police Agency, National Fire Agency and Coast Guard Administration after the ground column segment is concluded.

Mobile column 
The mobile column, for many years, served as a crowd favorite of National Day civil-military parades, since in this segment the ROC shows off to its people the advanced and modern military equipment and vehicles in service and those being introduced, many of them nationally produced, for use by the servicemen and women of the ROCAF, and since 2016, the state civil security institutions. As in every parade, the ROCMP's motorcycle column leads off the mobile column segment, followed by (as of 2016):

 ROCN mobile column
 Republic of China Marine Corps
 Amphibious Reconnaissance and Patrol Unit
 Amphibious Armor Group
 Coastal and air defense formations of the Republic of China Navy
 Republic of China Air Force mobile column
 Air defense guns and missiles
 Equipment and materiel, including air to air missiles
 Mobile column of ROCA formations and equipment (order as of 1991, 2007, 2011 and 2016 parades)
 Anti-tank weapons
 Signals
 Armored cavalry
 CBRN defense
 ROCA Corps of Engineers
 Motorized and mechanized infantry
 Armored formations
 Logistical and combat support
 Air defense and missiles (mobile missile and gun systems and truck-towed systems)
 Towed guns of the field artillery
 Self propelled artillery (MRLs and self-propelled guns)
 Disaster risk and response vehicles and equipment for calamity response operations
 National Police Agency
 Criminal Investigation Bureau vehicles and equipment
 NPA National Highway Police
 Mobile vehicles of the NPA's Special Police Corps
 National Fire Agency vehicles and equipment
 Coast Guard Administration small marine equipment and vehicles

Alongside the military and civil security mobile column, in the parades of the 70s and 80s and in more recent parades, a civil mobile column is present, composed of vehicles from the automobile and truck companies, state-owned firms, and the private sector.

Celebration outside Taiwan

Other countries

Overseas Chinese played a key role in the birth of the ROC since the nation's founding father Sun Yat-sen, a medical doctor by training, received financial support mainly from the overseas Chinese communities abroad to overthrow the imperial Qing dynasty and establish the second republic in Asia in 1912. Outside Taiwan, the National Day is also celebrated by many Overseas Chinese communities. Sizable National Day parades occur yearly in the Chinatowns of San Francisco and Chicago.

People's Republic of China
As the Chinese Communist Party became the official government of mainland China in 1949, 10 October is now celebrated in the People's Republic of China as the anniversary of the Xinhai Revolution and the Wuchang Uprising.

The former British colony of Hong Kong celebrated the ROC National Day as a public holiday until the government of the United Kingdom cut its diplomatic relations with the ROC Government as London recognized Beijing in 1950, shortly after the PRC's founding and it was postponed. The former Portuguese colony of Macau had celebrated the ROC national day as a public holiday until the government of Portugal cut its relations as Lisbon recognizes Beijing in 1979. After the civil war in mainland China, the National Day was celebrated in regions inhabited by Chinese patriots who remained loyal to the Republic. Before the sovereignty of Hong Kong was transferred to the PRC in 1997 and Macau also transferred in 1999, many ROC supporters there would display patriotic and colourful flags (mainly the national flag of ROC) to celebrate the National Day. Taiwan agencies in Hong Kong and Macau have annually held a public ceremony to celebrate the National Day of ROC with members of pro-ROC private groups. The day continues to be celebrated in Hong Kong and Macau after the transfer of sovereignty to the mainland, but the national flags publicly shown have been removed by Police of Hong Kong since July 1997 and by Police of Macau since December 1999. Flag-raising ceremony at Hung Lau, Tuen Mun, Sun Yat-sen's revolutionary base, is the most noticeable yearly event, organized by Johnny Mak. Since 2020, the event was celebrated as the PRC's Anniversary of the Xinhai Revolution rather than the ROC's Double Ten Day in line with the holidays in mainland China. Chris Tang claimed in September 2021 that celebrations in Hong Kong for Double Ten Day could risk breaching the national security law.
The event in Macau is commemorated under the name of the Xinhai Revolution Memorial Day.

See also
History of the Republic of China
National Day of the People's Republic of China
10 October 1943 uprising against the Japanese occupation of British Borneo
Hong Kong 1956 riots
Double Tenth Agreement
Hong Kong–Taiwan relations

References

External links

Republic of China Centenary Foundation  

October observances
Public holidays in Taiwan
1911 Revolution
Military parades
Parades in Taiwan
Anniversary of the Xinhai Revolution
China, Republic of
Autumn events in Taiwan